Tae may refer to:
Tae' language, Austronesian language spoken in Sulawesi, Indonesia
Tae (Korean name)
Tae, Uthumphon Phisai, tambon (local government unit) of Uthumphon Phisai District, northeastern Thailand
Tae (rugby union), player on Japan's Panasonic Wild Knights

TAE may refer to:
 TAE, the abbreviation for Τεχνικαί Αεροπορικαί Εκμεταλλεύσεις, a Greek airline that operated from 1935 to 1951 known in English as Technical and Aeronautical Holdings
 TAE (actor), Thai actor in the Chinese-language entertainment industry
 TAE buffer solution used in chemistry
 TAE connector for German telephone equipment
 TAE – Trabajos Aéreos y Enlaces, Spanish airline that operated from 1967 to 1981
 Technicien aéronautique d'exploitation
 Transportable Applications Environment
 TAE Technologies - formerly Tri Alpha Energy, an American company developing fusion power
 IATA code for Daegu International Airport, South Korea 
 ISO 639-3 code for the Tariana language, Maipurean language spoken in Amazonas, Brazil
 Tomás Alva Edison School in Mexico City